Independents Day is the sixth studio album by American hip-hop duo Twiztid. It was released on July 3, 2007 through Psychopathic Records. Production was handled by Fritz the Cat, G. Pierce, LostKoast Productions, Seven and Monoxide. It features guest appearances from Bizarre, Blaze Ya Dead Homie, DJ Clay, DJ Quik, (həd) p.e., Insane Clown Posse, Krizz Kaliko, Potluck, Proof, Tech N9ne, Tha Dogg Pound, The Dayton Family and The R.O.C. The album peaked at number 57 on the Billboard 200, number nine on the Top Rap Albums, number four on the Independent Albums and number eight on the Tastemakers.

The album's credits featured a number of mistakes. For example, the titles of the album's final two tracks were switched, and the names of Bizarre and DJ Quik are misspelled as 'Bizzar' and 'DJ Quick', which, as AllMusic's David Jeffries wrote, "[Ruins] the Blood member's lifelong avoidance of anything that could be short for 'Crip Killer.' [...] It's a metaphor for how well Twiztid blend with their true hip-hop brothers and how much better off they are going for local juggalos like their mentors ICP plus Blaze Ya Dead Homie and their neighbors from the north, the Dayton Family".

The album is also notable for appearances D12 members Proof and Bizarre. One of the group's members, Eminem, had feuded with ICP. The track "How I Live" was the final song recorded by Proof before his death in April 2006.

Track listing

Charts

References

External links

2007 albums
Twiztid albums
Psychopathic Records albums
Albums produced by Seven (record producer)